Baraut Assembly constituency is one of the 403 constituencies of the Uttar Pradesh Legislative Assembly, India. It is a part of the Bagpat district and one of the five assembly constituencies in the Bagpat Lok Sabha constituency. First election in this assembly constituency was held in 1952 after the "DPACO (1951)" (delimitation order 1951) was passed in 1951. After the 1969 elections, the constituency was dissolved. In 2008, when the "Delimitation of Parliamentary and Assembly Constituencies Order, 2008" was passed, the constituency was constituted again and elections were held in 2012. The constituency is assigned identification number 51.

History

First election in this assembly constituency was held in 1952 after the "SPACE (1951)" (delimitation order 1951) was passed in 1951.

In 1952, Umrao Dutta Ved won the elections and
became the first MLA (Member of Legislative Assembly) of Baraut.

In 1957, Umrao Dutta Ved retired from active politics and doing election campaigning for Acharya Dipankar. Acharya Dipankar won the election in 1957 with help of Umrao Dutt Ved.

In 1962, Indian National Congress candidate Mool Chand Shastri won the election and became a Member of Legislative Assembly.

In 1967, Mool Chand Shastri lost the election to Acharya Dipankar, but in April 1968, Acharya Dipankar died and from April 1968 to Feb. 1969 the legislative constituency worked under governor rule.

In 1969, Indian National Congress Candidate Vikram Singh won the election.
After the election of 1969, The Election Commission of India dissolved the constituency. But in 2008, when the "Delimitation of Parliamentary and Assembly Constituencies Order, 2008" was passed, the constituency was constituted again, and Legislative  Assembly elections were held in 2012.

In 2012, Lokesh Dixit won the Legislative elections.

In 2017, Krishan Pal Malik defeated Lokesh Dixit and became the Member of Legislative Assembly from Baraut.

In 2022, Krishan Pal Malik retained his seat by defeating Jaiveer of RLD by 315 votes.

Wards and areas
Extent of Baraut Assembly constituency is PCs Kheri Pradhan, Kotana, Luhari, Loyan, Malakpur, Shahpur Badoli, Sadiqpur Sinoli, Badawad, Sadatpur Jonmana, Bam, Badaka, Wazidpur, Mahawatpur, Jiwana, Bawali, Bijrol, Johari, Hilwari, Jagos of Baraut KC & Baraut MB of Baraut Tehsil; PCs Bali, Meetli, Niwara, Sisana, Gyasri Urf Gandhi, Saroorpur Kalan, Fatehpur Putthi, Dhanaura Silvernagar, Bichpari, Budhera, Naithla, Sultanpur Hatana, Faizpur Ninana, Goripur Jawahar Nagar, Dojha, Sujara, Tayodi & Khera Islampur of Baghpat KC of Baghpat Tehsil.

Members of the Legislative Assembly

Election results

2022

2017

2012

See also
Bagpat Lok Sabha constituency
Bagpat district
Sixteenth Legislative Assembly of Uttar Pradesh
Uttar Pradesh Legislative Assembly

References

External links
 

Assembly constituencies of Uttar Pradesh
Baraut